The Toyota B platform is a front-wheel drive automobile platform (also adaptable to four-wheel drive) that has underpinned various Toyota models from the subcompact and compact categories. The B platform improves on and replaces the NBC and sits below the MC and New MC platforms. Automobiles based on the B chassis started production in 2005 with the XP90 series Vitz/Yaris.

The B platform was replaced by TNGA-B platform.

Applications 
 Toyota Vitz/Yaris hatchback — XP90 (2005–2010), XP130 (2010–2019)
 Toyota Belta/Vios/Yaris sedan — XP90 (2005–2013)
 Toyota ist/Urban Cruiser/Scion xD — XP110 (2007–2016)
 Toyota Porte/Spade — XP140 (2012–2020)
 Toyota Ractis/Verso-S/Subaru Trezia — XP100 (2005–2010), XP120 (2010–2016)
 Toyota Sienta — XP170 (2015–2022)
 Toyota Probox/Succeed — XP160 (2014–present)
 Toyota Prius c — NHP10 (2011–2021)
 Toyota Corolla Axio/Fielder — E160 (2012–2020)
 Toyota JPN Taxi/Comfort Hybrid — NTP10 (2017–present)

References 

B